The Samsung NX 10mm F3.5 Fisheye is an interchangeable camera lens announced by Samsung on June 11, 2013.

References
http://www.dpreview.com/products/samsung/lenses/samsung_10_3p5/specifications

010mm F3.5 Fisheye
Camera lenses introduced in 2013